Working Class Woman is the fourth solo studio album by Marie Davidson. It was released on Ninja Tune on 5 October 2018.

Production
The album was created in Montreal and Berlin. Marie Davidson says: "It comes from my brain, through my own experiences: the suffering and the humour, the fun and the darkness to be Marie Davidson."

Critical reception

At Metacritic, which assigns a weighted average score out of 100 to reviews from mainstream critics, the album received an average score of 85, based on 9 reviews, indicating "universal acclaim".

Paul Simpson of AllMusic gave the album 4 stars out of 5, saying: "With greater emotional depth and sonic clarity than her past recordings, Working Class Woman is an exciting breakthrough for Davidson." Sophie Kemp of Pitchfork wrote: "The lines between seriousness and humor are blurry, and that's kind of the point, where the album excels is in Davidson's ability to very much intentionally confuse her listener." Briony Pickford of The Skinny gave the album 5 stars out of 5, describing it as "a mix of successful, feminist personas commenting over relentless drums and chaotic synths."

Track listing
All music composed by Marie Davidson; all words written by Davidson; all tracks produced by Davidson and Pierre Guerineau, except where noted.

Personnel
Credits adapted from the liner notes of Working Class Woman.

Musicians
 Marie Davidson – music, words
 Pierre Guerineau – backing vocals 
 Bernardino Femminielli – backing vocals 
 Motorkiller – voice 

Technical personnel
 Marie Davidson – production
 Pierre Guerineau – production
 Asaël Robitaille – production 
 Cristobal Urbina – production 
 Max Gilkes – mastering

Design
 MMBP – artwork
 Etienne Saint-Denis – photography

References

External links
 
 

2018 albums
Ninja Tune albums
Marie Davidson albums